Matti Herronen (born 19 January 1933) is a Finnish former cyclist. He competed in the individual road race and team time trial events at the 1960 Summer Olympics.

References

External links
 

1933 births
Living people
Finnish male cyclists
Olympic cyclists of Finland
Cyclists at the 1960 Summer Olympics
People from Kokkola
Sportspeople from Central Ostrobothnia